Chaetopeltidaceae are a family of green algae in the order  Chaetopeltidales.

References

External links

Chlorophyceae families
Chaetopeltidales